The first USS Goldsborough (Torpedo Boat No. 20/TB-20/Coast Torpedo Boat No. 7) was a torpedo boat in the United States Navy during World War I. She was named for Louis M. Goldsborough.

Goldsborough was launched 29 July 1899 by the Wolff & Zwicker Iron Works, Portland, Oregon; sponsored by Miss Gertrude Ballin; commissioned in the Puget Sound Navy Yard 9 April 1908.

Goldsborough based at San Diego, California, as a unit of the Pacific Torpedo Fleet, cruising for 6 years along the coast of California and the Pacific Coast of Mexico in a schedule of torpedo practice, and joint fleet exercises and maneuvers. She was placed in ordinary at the Mare Island Navy Yard 26 March 1914 ; served the Oregon State Naval Militia at Portland (December 1914-April 1917) ; and again fully commissioned 7 April 1917 for Pacific coast patrol throughout World War I.

She was designated Coast Torpedo Boat No. 7 on 1 August 1918, her name being assigned to a new destroyer under construction. The torpedo boat decommissioned in the Puget Sound Navy Yard, Bremerton, Washington, 12 March 1919 and sold for scrapping on 8 September 1919.

References

Additional technical data from

External links

Torpedo boats of the United States Navy
Ships built in Portland, Oregon
1899 ships